Deleni is a commune in Constanța County, Northern Dobruja, Romania.

It is situated in the south of Constanța County at 59 km of Constanța city.

The villages of the commune are:

Deleni (historical name: Ienidja, Enigea or Enige)
Petroșani (historical names: Chioseler)
Pietreni (historical names: Cocargea until 1964)
Șipotele (historical names: Ghiolpunar)

Demographics
At the 2011 census, Deleni had 2,272 Romanians (98.31%), 10 Turks (0.43%), 28 Tatars (1.21%), 1 others (0.04%).

References

Communes in Constanța County
Localities in Northern Dobruja